Volodymyr Zhuravchak (born 3 May 1957) is a Ukrainian football coach and a former player.

Coaching career
The first team that he coached was FC Karpaty Kamianka-Buzka in 1991. He was also the head coach of FC Karpaty Lviv.

On 1 February 2012 he became the head coach of the FC Lviv in the  Ukrainian First League.

In June 2012 he was appointed as assistant coach in SC Tavriya Simferopol in the Ukrainian Premier League.

References

External links
 

1957 births
People from Boryslav
Living people
Soviet footballers
Ukrainian footballers
Association football defenders
FC Volyn Lutsk players
FC Metalist Kharkiv players
FC Kuban Krasnodar players
FC SKA-Karpaty Lviv players
FC Skala Stryi (1911) players
Soviet Top League players
Ukrainian football managers
Ukrainian Premier League managers
FC Skala Stryi (1911) managers
FC Hazovyk Komarno managers
FC Karpaty Lviv managers
FC Lviv managers
Ukrainian expatriate football managers
Expatriate football managers in Latvia
Sportspeople from Lviv Oblast